Midway, Kentucky is a city in Woodford County, Kentucky, United States.

Midway, Kentucky may also refer to:

 Midway, Calloway County, Kentucky, an unincorporated community
 Midway, Crittenden County, Kentucky, an unincorporated community
 Midway, Edmonson County, Kentucky, an unincorporated community
 Midway, Meade County, Kentucky, an unincorporated community